Amit Rahav (Hebrew: עמית רהב; born 9 August 1995) is an Israeli actor. He is best known for his role as Yanky Shapiro in the 2020 Netflix miniseries Unorthodox.

Early life 
Rahav was born in Tel Aviv, Israel to a British mother and Israeli father, and he grew up in an English-speaking household. His parents are divorced. He was raised as a secular Jew and continues to define himself as such.

At 18, he began serving a three year term in the Israel Defense Forces in the theater and entertainment troop. He was a drama counselor in Clayton, Georgia at Camp Ramah Darom for three months in summer 2016 through the Jewish Agency for Israel.

Career 
Since he left the military, Rahav has appeared in various movies and television shows. His first significant role was on the Israeli TV show, Mishpacha Sholetet, and he has since acted in various other Israeli shows. In 2015, he appeared in two episodes of the American thriller TV series Dig.

In 2016, he appeared in Flashback, an Israeli show for teenagers. Rahav's portrayal of Aviv, a student who comes out as gay on the show, made history as Aviv was the first gay character in an Israeli children's show.

In 2020, Rahav starred as Yanky Shapiro in the German-American Netflix original miniseries Unorthodox. In April 2020, he signed with talent agency Lighthouse Management & Media.

Personal life 
Rahav is currently a second year student at the Yoram Loewenstein Performing Arts Studio in Tel Aviv. He took time off school to film Unorthodox and had to re-audition to continue attending. He is openly gay.

Rahav and his Unorthodox co-star Shira Haas have been friends for 10 years, after meeting at a party at age 15. The two are neighbors in Tel Aviv.

He speaks fluent Hebrew and English, and he is a vegetarian.

Filmography

Television

Film

Awards

References

External links
 

1995 births
21st-century Israeli male actors
Male actors from Tel Aviv
Living people
Israeli people of British descent
Israeli gay actors
Gay Jews
Yiddish film actors
21st-century Israeli LGBT people